The Marine Mammals Protection Act 1978 is an Act of Parliament passed in New Zealand in 1978. It is administered by the Department of Conservation.

The environmental organisation Project Jonah gave the major impetus for the government to create the Act.

See also
Whaling in New Zealand

References

External links
Text of the Act
Marine Mammals Protection Regulations 1992
Marine Mammals Protection Act at the Department of Conservation

Statutes of New Zealand
1978 in New Zealand law
Whaling in New Zealand
Marine conservation
Mammal conservation
1978 in the environment
Whale conservation
Seal conservation
Environmental law in New Zealand